Peter Rajniak (25 May 1953 – 4 February 2000) was a Slovak basketball player. He competed in the men's tournament at the 1980 Summer Olympics.

See also
Czechoslovak Basketball League career stats leaders

References

External links
 

1953 births
2000 deaths
Czechoslovak men's basketball players
Olympic basketball players of Czechoslovakia
Basketball players at the 1980 Summer Olympics
Sportspeople from Liptovský Mikuláš
1982 FIBA World Championship players
Slovak men's basketball players